Warren W. Prevey (September 23, 1874 – February 6, 1948) was a business man and politician from Alberta, Canada. He served as a member of Edmonton City Council from 1917 to 1919 and later as a member of the Legislative Assembly of Alberta from 1926 to 1930 sitting with the Liberal caucus in opposition.

Early life
Prevey founded Edmonton City Dairy & Barns Co. circa 1926 to deliver dairy products to residents in Edmonton, Alberta.

Political career
Prevey began his political career on the municipal level. He ran for a seat to Edmonton City Council in the 1917 Edmonton municipal election. Prevey won the sixth place seat out of seven to earn a two-year term as an alderman. He did not run for a second term in 1919.

Prevey ran for a seat to the Alberta Legislature as a Liberal candidate in the 1926 Alberta general election. He won the second last of five seats in the district.

Prevey ran for re-election in the 1930 Alberta general election but was defeated. He finished in seventh place on the first vote count - and did not receive enough alternate preferences from voters in subsequent counts.

References

External links
Legislative Assembly of Alberta Members Listing
Edmonton Public Library Biography of Warren Prevey

Alberta Liberal Party MLAs
Edmonton city councillors
1874 births
1948 deaths
People from Elroy, Wisconsin
American emigrants to Canada